Square's role-playing video game Final Fantasy VI (released as Final Fantasy III in North America) features fourteen permanent player characters, the largest number of any game in the main Final Fantasy series, as well as a number of characters who are only briefly controlled by the player.

Concept and design
Final Fantasy VI was the first game of the series to feature character designers other than Yoshitaka Amano. While Amano drew most of the character artworks, monster designer and graphic director Tetsuya Nomura created the original designs and many story episodes for Shadow and Setzer Gabbiani, and field graphic designer Kaori Tanaka created the original designs of Edgar Roni Figaro and Sabin Rene Figaro. A character named Angela was developed and then cut from the game. She was to be like a "big sister" to Cyan and wield a whip, allowing the story to explore Cyan's vulnerability and private side.

Co-director Kitase wanted to create many characters that could stand up to be main characters and ensure the story did not revolve around one character, so each character could have something to bring to the table. In fact, one of the themes of the production was "everyone is the main character" according to Yoshinori Kitase, one of the game's two directors. Kitase also believes that this approach with the game's characters is one of the game's lasting appeals. And despite having a large cast of playable characters, the game is well known for its subtle revealing of character relationships and backstories over the length of the story. Cut scenes of character interaction also feature simulated "camera movement", with a similar emotional effect found in movies. During the game's development, the whole team contributed to the stories of the game's characters, which were then adjusted for consistency with the story by Kitase. Instead of just being "ciphers for fighting, players would have more choice in what the characters would do, and how that would alter the narrative and invest the player more deeply in the story. To make the characters even more distinct, their fighting styles and abilities were all made totally different as well. Balancing so many characters was a challenge, and as a result Celes and Kefka became much bigger characters than were initially planned.

Main playable characters

Terra Branford

Hironobu Sakaguchi, the Final Fantasy series creator, greatly influenced the character's creation. Originally, Terra was to disappear with all the other Espers at games end, but the developers decided it would be a "waste" to have the character discover her humanity and be erased, so she instead lost her powers.

Locke Cole 
 is a thief, though he personally prefers to identify himself as a "treasure hunter". Like Terra, Hironobu Sakaguchi was also a major contributor to the creation of Locke. IGN praised Locke as being the connection between Terra and Celes, helping tie the plot together, and having a unique ability to steal from his enemies.

He bears a personal vendetta against the Empire for assaulting his hometown, killing his amnesiac love interest Rachel in the course of the attack. Her last word is Locke's name. Driven by the conviction that failing Rachel led to her death, Locke seeks to protect both Terra and Celes as he fights with the Returners against the Empire; Locke is equally compelled to seek a means of restoring Rachel's life, as his drive to right his greatest wrong took him to the depths of the Phoenix Cave to acquire the "rebirth" power of the esper Phoenix to save his lost love. The Phoenix Cave itself is a difficult dungeon requiring two parties to traverse and featuring lots of enemies that are vulnerable to light attacks such as Holy. The player will also find that some of the treasure chests are empty, though Locke will give the contents to the party once the dungeon is cleared. In the end, Rachel urges him to move on to find someone new to protect, and gives Celes her blessing to watch over him before departing for the afterlife. He is also featured in the rhythm game Theatrhythm Final Fantasy as a subcharacter representing Final Fantasy VI. Locke also appears in Dissidia Final Fantasy NT, voiced by Yūki Ono in Japanese and Jonathan von Mering in English.

Celes Chere 

 is a former general of the Empire, genetically and artificially enhanced into a Magitek Knight following a magic infusion. Co-director Yoshinori Kitase revealed that he put much effort into creating Celes, and she is his favorite character in the game.

First encountered in the dungeons below South Figaro, Celes is rescued by Locke before her impending execution over protesting the poisoning of Doma Castle. Later in the journey, Celes is used as a body double for the opera diva Maria to fool Setzer into providing transport in his airship to the Empire's capital of Vector. Within Vector's Magitek Research Facility, Kefka and an elite contingent of Magitek-armored troops attack the party – prompting Celes to warp herself and the antagonizers away, saving her friends. Kefka's claims of Celes operating as a double-agent create a schism with her and Locke, though their mutual trust is restored at the conclusion of the events on Crescent Island. On the Floating Continent Celes again rejects the Empire's plans, denying Gestahl's lust for power and impaling Kefka with her blade after being ordered to slay her comrades for amnesty. Regardless, Kefka succeeds in ravaging the surface of the planet by loosing the divine power of the Warring Triad.

Celes is the initial character in the World of Ruin, awakening a full year after the global devastation caused by Kefka's actions. Having been nursed back to health by Cid, the player has the chance to return the favor, either resulting in his death (which leads to a scene of attempted suicide and the discovery of Locke's bandana upon an injured seagull) or his survival (prompting reaffirmation in the belief her friends remain alive). Each outcome results in her departing the island aboard a home-made wooden raft. Over the remaining course of the game, Locke and Celes gradually develop a relationship.

She is also featured in the rhythm game Theatrhythm Final Fantasy as a subcharacter representing Final Fantasy VI. Her theme, "Celes's Theme", is also featured in the game. Celes also appears in World of Final Fantasy where she is voiced by Houko Kuwashima in Japanese and Christina Rose in English.

Edgar Figaro 
 is the young king of Figaro. Edgar was originally supposed to be a womanizer, but this was considered too cliche and evolved into him having lost his mother as an infant. He later fell in love with an older woman but was killed in a "political rivalry", and she remained his version of an ideal woman.

Years before the game's events, neither he nor his twin brother, Sabin, bear any desire for the crown. Edgar determines the succession with the flip of a double-sided coin to grant his brother's deeper wish for a free life, relegating himself to the burden of rule. Edgar later reveals the facts of this rigged gamble to Sabin. As Figaro's monarch, Edgar publicly maintains a strong alliance with the Gestahlian Empire, but secretly provides support and aid to the Returners, a rebel group seeking the liberation of conquered city-states. He fancies himself a ladies' man, earning a reputation as a die-hard womanizer. While attempting to arrange a meeting between Terra and the Returners' leadership, the Empire's court mage, Kefka, makes a surprise inspection of Figaro, seeking Terra. With Kefka's subsequent torching of Figaro, the alliance between the two nations is broken. Edgar helps Terra make contact with the Returners, reuniting with Sabin along the way, and later helps the party reach the western portion of the northern continent after the Narshe assault by means of Figaro Castle's submerging capability. During the World of Ruin, he appears disguised as a mercenary thief-for-hire named Gerad (an anagram of Edgar) in order to get back into the sunken wreck of his castle. Thereafter he returns to the player's control.

IGN described Edgar as flirtatious but heroic, providing comic relief but a strong leader in fighting for the rebels. Edgar also appears in World of Final Fantasy where he is voiced by Shin-ichiro Miki in Japanese and Ray Chase in English.

Sabin Figaro 
Soraya Saga, the co-creator of Xenogears, also helped shape Sabin's character.

Disgusted by the cold arbitration of his royal succession, Sabin leaves his heritage behind after winning a rigged coin toss to determine whether he or Edgar would not inherit Figaro's throne. He initially trains under the world-famous martial arts master Duncan Harcourt together with Duncan's son, Vargas. As the years of training wear on, Vargas grows increasingly jealous of Sabin's martial prowess, apparently slaying Duncan in a wrathful fit and fleeing to the mountains, with Sabin in pursuit. It is during these events that the Returners, accompanied by Sabin's brother Edgar, encounter him. With Vargas' defeat, Sabin is prompted to join the cause against the Empire, and after a period of separation where he meets Shadow, Cyan, and Gau following the Imperial siege of Doma, he participates in the defense of Narshe.

After the world's devastation, Sabin is the first ally Celes is led to encounter, found supporting the crumbling wreck of a mansion in Tzen after an attack by Kefka's 'Light of Judgment'. In this event, Celes has to rescue a child still inside the mansion and escape in six minutes, so the player will have to judge whether or not a battle is worth fighting, especially since some of the enemies can inflict the Condemned status, and often cannot be killed in one hit. If the time runs out, Sabin will not be able to hold it anymore and will lose his grip, causing a Game Over. However, according to an interview with the developers, originally, letting time run out in this event, would cause Sabin's death, and returning to the town later with Edgar in the party and sleeping here would trigger a night-time cutscene where he frantically digs among the rubble to find his twin brother's body, but they changed it because the World of Ruin was already dark as it was. He later finds Duncan alive and well in the World of Ruin, somewhere east of Narshe, having survived Vargas' attack. From him, Sabin learns his final martial technique, the Phantom Rush.

Cyan Garamonde 
His name is pronounced Kaien, as the term kaien, which means "sea swallow", is typical of samurai, who are Japanese, and Cyan is a Samurai himself. This also fits with his Desperation Attack, Tsubame Gaeshi, but this reference was lost in the Western traduction because the in-game names can't be longer than six letters and the translators mistook his name for the "pepper of the same name", and while the limit was removed in the ports from Game Boy Advance, PC and mobile devices, his name in the West was unchanged. Stalwart in the defense of his home against the Empire's assault, he defeats the enemy commander, but Kefka poisons Doma's water supply, which kills everyone in the castle except for him and a sentry, and not even the king was spared by this fate. When he discovers that his wife Elayne and his young son Owain, have died because of the poison, Cyan launces a suicidal attack on the Imperial siege encampment in a murderous rage, being assisted and rescued by Sabin. Shortly thereafter he encounters the spirits of his deceased loved ones aboard the Phantom Train, sending him into a depressed spiral that persists until the game's second half. Cyan later grows close to Gau after finding him on the Veldt, taking a protective, almost fatherly role over the abandoned child.

During the World of Ruin, Cyan sequesters himself atop Mt. Zozo, writing pseudo-love letters under the guise of a deceased Imperial soldier to Lola, a woman in Miranda. This same soldier had previously requested Cyan and company write to Lola on his behalf upon meeting him in Mobliz before the planet's destruction. Later, the player has the chance to bring Cyan to the aging ruins of Doma Castle, and when chosen to sleep here with him in the party will trigger a sidequest: Cyan will have a nightmare and won't wake up the next morning and three demon triplets named after the Three Stooges (called the Three Dream Stooges) invade his soul to devour it, with the rest of the party in hot pursuit to save him. Cyan's soul is represented as a four-stage dungeon: the first stage is a rather disorienting area where one party member must find the other two team members and then tackle the Three Stooges. The second stage of the dungeon is based loosely on the Phantom Train, and the third stage loosely based on the Narshe mines. The last stage is based on Doma Castle itself, with a similar layout, allowing the party to view some of Cyan's fondest memories (such as teaching his son Owain how to use a sword), and the party cannot backtrack to a previous stage upon clearing one. The fourth part contains the dungeon's final boss: Wrexsoul, a demon composed by the souls of the people who died in the War of the Magi that latches onto Cyan, feeding off the negative emotions that he felt from the poisoning of Doma, and eating him alive. He even gets brainwashed, indicating that his PTSD, his guilt, depression and shame for his failure in protecting everyone in Doma, even his wife and son, and in stopping Kefka from destroying the world were so bad that he was willing to give up his own soul. This could imply that the party is traveling through Cyan's memories themselves. When Wrexsoul is defeated, Cyan is freed and overcomes his guilt, restoring his faith in himself and his ability to live life, snapping out of it after meeting Elayne and Owain, who leave to him the Masamune katana. Cyan speaks in a style resembling Shakespearean English, often using words and phrases such as "thou art" and "shalt not" and so on, and he also usually calls his male companions sir and the girls lady. Likewise, Cyan makes frequent use of the archaic copula verb "gozaru" in the Japanese version, a common feature of the faux-historic dialect used by samurai and ninja in other contemporary Japanese media.

While being a serious and gloomy character to the story with the deaths of his wife and son, Cyan also gave some light-hearted comedy at times with his relationship with Gau, with whom he grew very close, taking a protective, almost fatherly role over the boy. Cyan also had a predisposition to difficulty with technology.

Shadow 

 is an assassin and mercenary for hire, who is always accompanied by his faithful dog, Interceptor. During the first half of the game, Shadow operates only on a freelance basis, at times available to the player for a fee and at times appearing in the employ of the Gestahlian Empire. In two instances within the World of Balance, Shadow is forced into the player's party: Crescent Island and the Floating Continent. Shadow's fate is determined entirely by player action on the latter area; if the player has enough time to wait before leaping to the airship, Shadow will eventually accompany the party aboard the Blackjack and be available for permanent recruitment in the World of Ruin.

In the second half of the game, Shadow is, if rescued, found injured within the Cave on the Veldt and is returned to Strago's home in Thamasa to heal.  Later on, he may be acquired by betting an item he seeks at the Dragon's Neck Coliseum and winning the ensuing match. Whenever Shadow is placed in the party, his backstory is revealed through dreams and nightmare sequences by using a Tent or resting at an Inn. Shadow's actual name is Clyde and he once lived a life of crime with his partner, Baram ("Billy" in the Japanese version). The pair are infamous in the pre-war period before the game begins as a duo of train robbers known as the Shadow Bandits, but Baram eventually suffers mortal wounds during a failed railway heist. Baram tasks Clyde to finish him off, but Clyde instead panics, fleeing his friend. An indeterminate span of time passes, seeing Clyde collapse from exhaustion upon reaching Thamasa, found by a young woman and her dog. It is heavily implied (and was actually confirmed in a 1995 interview with the game's developers) that Clyde fathers Relm, another character from the game, with this woman, eventually departing Thamasa under the guise of Shadow to escape his guilt over abandoning Baram.

At the game's conclusion, Shadow remains within the crumbling ruin of Kefka's tower, quietly separating from the party and encouraging Interceptor to flee with the others. His final words are directed to Baram: "It looks like I can finally stop running... Come and find me all right?" (Japanese version: "I don't need to run away anymore. Embrace me warmly"). Interceptor is later seen with Relm in Strago's section of the ending. In Final Fantasy VI Advance it is implied that Shadow remained behind in Kefka's tower as it collapsed, allowing himself to die. Despite appearing in only one major role, the character was well received, including being voted at number seven in a popularity poll for Final Fantasy series characters by V Jump in 1995.

Gau 
 is a thirteen-year-old feral child who lives among the animals on the Veldt, having survived in this harsh environment nearly his entire life. Yoshinori Kitase, one of the game's two directors, spent the most time developing Gau, stating that stories like Flowers for Algernon as well as tales about children raised by wolves were the inspiration and origin of Gau, though it evolved further from there.

His powers of speech are poor, barely capable of communicating with others and often growing frustrated with complex sentences (in the Japanese version this frustration is further exaggerated). Initially encountered by Sabin and Cyan, Gau is tempted into the party with a slab of dried meat and returns the favor by presenting the pair with Mobliz' missing Diving Helm, enabling the trio to survive the underwater current of the Serpent's Trench and eventually reunite with the Returners. He grows close to Cyan very quickly, becoming fast friends with him immediately upon their first meeting, calling him "Mr. Thou". He has a very strange power: he is able to assume the powers and elemental resistances of any monster fought previously with his Rage techniques (for example: the Rhinotaur Rage technique grants him the ability to absorb lightning damage; he also gets a lightning attack from it).

Gau is again encountered on the Veldt in the World of Ruin. In this second part of the game his origins are more thoroughly explored – by taking him and Sabin to the old man in the lone house west of the Veldt where Sabin's subplot first began in the World of Balance, it is learned that this man is, in fact, Gau's father, having tossed him into the wilds shortly after the death of his wife in childbirth and consequently labeling Gau a "demon child". This was mentioned when Sabin first visits the port town of Nikeah, when he talks to a woman who says the man had tossed his own child out of his home thirteen years ago.

Setzer Gabbiani 
 is a gambler who owns the Blackjack, the only known airship in the world. He is first encountered by the party after being tricked into kidnapping Celes Chere instead of Maria, the opera diva with whom he's enraptured. Capitalizing on Setzer's love of gambling and chance, Celes coerces him into a bet using Edgar's double-faced coin, the result of which is his joining the Returners and committing his airship to their service. His ship, however, is torn apart when Kefka unleashes the divine power of the Warring Triad. In the World of Ruin, Setzer is found lamenting the loss of his ship in the pub of Kohlingen. Once reminded of his former bravery, he elects to lead his comrades to the tomb of his long-deceased friend, Daryl. In the depths of the crypt Setzer relives his memories of his and Daryl's romantic rivalry, revealing the restored hulk of her airship, the Falcon, which is turned over to player control.

Setzer also makes a small appearance in Kingdom Hearts II, as the reigning champion of the false Twilight Town's Struggle tournament, where he fights with Roxas, the first playable character of the game. He is either victorious or defeated, depending on the player's ability, and the plot advances either way.

The character was created by designer Tetsuya Nomura, who helped give him personality, look, and background. Setzer appears in Kingdom Hearts and is voiced by Ryōtarō Okiayu in the Japanese version and Crispin Freeman in the English version.

Strago Magus 
 is an elderly gentleman living in the village of Thamasa. He is Relm's grandfather and (together with the other inhabitants of Thamasa) a descendant of the ancient Mage Warriors who fought in the War of the Magi. Through his magical ancestry, Strago is able to learn techniques used by enemies, known as Lore (Blue Magic). He joins the Returners in thanks for saving Relm from a burning building, helping them seek the Espers on Crescent Island. He departs Thamasa with Relm, joining the party permanently, after Kefka's brutal attack on his village. Convinced of the worst for his granddaughter in the World of Ruin, Strago enthralls himself to the Cult of Kefka in a fit of depression, snapping out of his trance only when confronted by Relm. Strago later returns to Thamasa with Relm, confronted by an old friend with whom he once hunted the legendary beast, Hidon, and is compelled to seek out and destroy the monster. Undertaking this side quest enables Strago to learn the ultimate Blue Magic, though contrary to what he says to Relm, he does not have to tackle it alone (he must, however, be in the party during the battle with Hidon). Very early on in the development of Final Fantasy VI, there was an idea of Strago developing his own village in the style of Sim City, but was cancelled due to lack of time in the development schedule.

Relm Arrowny 
 is a ten-year-old artist from the village of Thamasa, the granddaughter of Strago, and the youngest playable character in the game. When the group arrives in Thamasa, she meets them briefly, and they later save her from a burning house. She joins the party after tailing the player in the Esper Cave, despite complaints from Strago, and saves them during a scripted battle against Ultros. In the World of Ruin, Relm is either first found unconscious in the Cave on the Veldt (in the event the player did not wait for Shadow on the Floating Continent) or tasked with a commissioned painting by the grossly-deformed Owzer. Once Relm is recruited in the second half of the game, her presence in the party will snap Strago out of his chanting march at the base of the Cult of Kefka's tower.

Scenes with Relm and Interceptor upon the party's first meeting further imply that she is Shadow's daughter, supporting flashbacks during Shadow's dream sequences. A relic special to Relm, the Memento Ring, directly references her departed mother – Shadow is the only other character capable of equipping this item.

Mog 
 is a moogle who lives within the caves of Narshe with the rest of his species. He is distinguished from all the other moogles encountered in that he can speak human language, which was taught to him by the Esper, Ramuh, in Mog's dreams. During the game's introductory sequences, he and many other moogles help Terra and Locke escape from Narshe. Later in the story, Mog may be saved from a villainous thief, Lone Wolf, or abandoned for acquisition of an item. Either way, Mog is again encountered in the depths of the moogles' abandoned hollow in the World of Ruin. His class is a "Geomancer". These skills are learned based on the terrain, and activate attacks that incorporate the terrain, such as landslides, sandstorms, avalanches, forests and so forth.

Gogo 
 is the first of two hidden characters in the game, encountered should the party be engulfed entirely by a creature on Triangle Island called the Zone Eater. In the game's development stage, Gogo was even harder to find as he wandered between different pubs in the World of Ruin, disguising himself as characters you had not yet re-recruited. Only after players find the real character could they then return to the fake one and Gogo would reveal himself and be recruitable.

A self-described "master of simulacrum", Gogo opts to mimic the party's desire to save the world, thus accompanying them. Gogo's gender is not known. He or she is so shrouded in clothing that even the body's form is indecipherable. It is assumed that Gogo's identity and gender remain vague because, as a mime who copies others, these facts are irrelevant. A boss named Gogo previously appeared in Final Fantasy V as a boss at the depths of the sunken Walse Tower, guarding the final crystal shard, which granted the Mime job class.

Umaro 
 is a yeti and the second hidden character in the game. In the World of Balance, references to him are made by citizens of Narshe with dubious sobriety, though he can be seen peering out of a cave above the entrance to the mine shafts. He is encountered much later in the game during the World of Ruin, after the group fights him over a Magicite shard. Should Mog be in the player party, he will convince Umaro to join the group.

Umaro cannot be controlled during battle and he can only equip relics. However, two of these relics, which only he can equip, grant him some powerful special attacks that he may use even in the Tower where the Cult of Kefka resides (everyone else can only use magic unless the "Berserk" spell is cast on them). One of these attacks, granted by the Rage Orb, allows him to fling a party member at an enemy: this doesn't hurt the thrown party member and can even damage an enemy a fair amount. The second attack, granted by the Blizzard Orb, allows him to strike all enemies for ice-based damage. As always, the player has no control over when these attacks are used.

Other major characters 
This section covers other characters who either play a major role in the plot, or are briefly controllable by the player (but without the full range of options given to the above fourteen characters).

Kefka Palazzo 

 is a sociopathic nihilist who served the Gestahlian Empire as Court Mage until he used the Warring Triad to devastate the world. He serves as the main antagonist of the game. IGN describes him as "dominating" the history of the Final Fantasy franchise for his maniacal representation of evil.

Ultros
, whose name is Orthros in the Japanese version, is a large, talking, purple, carnivorous octopus who appears multiple times as both antagonist and comic relief. Each time he appears to fight the party, he is bent on making a meal out of them, making him the first (and, so far, only) carnivorous antagonist in Final Fantasy history. IGN called him "unintentionally hilarious", noting his lack of any real motivation to follow the heroes and fight them so many times. Ultros appears in Dissidia: Final Fantasy as a summon, again using the name Ultros. Ultros also makes a cameo appearance in the film Kingsglaive: Final Fantasy XV.

Typhon
, whose name is Chupon in the original North American Super NES version, is a large, red, two-headed floating monster, who appears as Ultros' "friend" while fighting the party while they are going to the Floating Continent, the final stage of the World of Balance. Typhon doesn't speak often but has a volatile temper, according to Ultros. After the game shifts to the World of Ruin, the two of them end up working as a receptionist and combatant in the Colosseum. Typhon's specific purpose here seems to be discouraging the betting of "useless" items, rather than actually fighting, by snorting the betters out of the arena. Ultros, sometimes under the name Orthros, and Typhon have since appeared in other games: both are optional bosses in Final Fantasy I & II: Dawn of Souls under the names Orthros and Typhon, Ultros is a boss in Final Fantasy IV: The After Years, and as a boss in Chocobo's Dungeon 2 under the name Orthros again. Orthros also makes an appearance in Final Fantasy XII as an elite mark black flan who attacks women, and Typhon appears in Final Fantasy VII as a summon. He also appears, again as a flan named Orthros in Final Fantasy Tactics A2. Ultros and Typhon appear in Final Fantasy XIII-2 as downloadable content, and again as an optional boss fight in Final Fantasy XIV: A Realm Reborn.

Leo Cristophe 
 is one of the three top generals of the Empire, the others being Celes and Kefka. Unlike his compatriots, Leo refused to undergo Magitek infusion. Fiercely loyal and possessed of a strong sense of personal honor, Leo conducts himself with a measure of restraint and ability otherwise absent in the tyrannical ambitions of the Empire. His siege of Doma sought to minimize casualties on both sides of the fighting until Kefka's poisoning of the water supply, and he is the first to espouse the Emperor's later, apparent desires for an end to the war. Leo later leads the Imperial mission to seek a truce with the Espers on Crescent Island, accompanied by both the Returners and the troops loyal to him. This turns out to be a ruse meant not only to lure the Espers into a trap (seeing Kefka reduce them to Magicite to collect for the Empire) but to also eliminate Leo and other Imperial dissidents who might threaten Gestahl's plans. Although more than a match for Kefka's tricks in combat, Leo is eventually – and brutally – cut down after Kefka masquerades as Gestahl, playing on Leo's unswerving loyalty to kill him. He is thereafter buried by the Returners and surviving villagers of Thamasa.

Temporarily controllable only during Kefka's assault, Leo has a special ability called 'Shock' that deals heavy damage to all foes about him by creating a powerful energy field. He is also in possession of powerful equipment and Relics the player is unable to acquire until much later in the game.

Banon 

 is the leader of the Returners, a group of rebels that opposes the Empire's harsh oppression. The party first meets him in the Returners' secret base, where he plans to have Terra try and speak with the frozen Esper in Narshe. He later accompanies them to the imperial capital of Vector when Gestahl proposes a truce, which eventually turns out to be a ruse. They have a party and a laugh about it but he is last seen among the ruins of Vector after the Espers destroyed it. His fate after Kefka's rise to power is unknown.
Banon is temporarily controllable during a mission to transport him from the Returners' secret base to Narshe. His special command, 'Pray', is a powerful healing ability that targets the entire party and does not use magic points.

Cid Marquez 
 is the chief magical researcher of the Empire, and one of the many incarnations of Cid in the series. His pursuits lead to the creation of the Magitek labs and production facilities, together with the development of Magitek armor and soldiers. He is very close to Celes, turning against the Empire upon witnessing her fight against Kefka. In the World of Ruin, he washes up on the same lonely island as Celes, caring for her throughout the duration of her coma. Those others who wash up along with them eventually fall to despair and commit suicide before she awakens. Celes is turned over to the player's control at this point, and Cid's ultimate fate is left to the player's ability to care for him in the sequence that follows. Should Cid die, Celes will discover a letter and the key to Cid's raft after attempting suicide herself. In the event Cid is nursed back to health, he will provide the raft for Celes of his own accord, wishing her farewell.

Emperor Gestahl  

 is the aging, power-hungry dictator of the militaristic Empire. Obsessed with the legends of magical power dating from the ancient War of the Magi, Gestahl seeks the sealed world of the Espers prior to the game's beginning, affording him the capture of dozens of Espers – Terra's father and Terra herself among them. These enslaved few would form the basis for the Empire's Magitek in the years to come, the fruit of this research enabling Gestahl to crush the city-states on the southern continent and expand northward. Later in the game, his second attempt to enter the Esper world proves largely successful, though the culmination of these events lead to his death at the hands of Kefka and the destruction of the world.

Maduin and Madeline 
They meet after Madeline accidentally stumbles into the Esper world, and Maduin nurses her back to health. Though other Espers do not trust her, Maduin defends her, and they soon conceive Terra. Eventually Gestahl invades the area, captures Maduin, kills Madeline, and takes Terra with him. Maduin is drained of his magic for twenty years before he is finally reduced to Magicite. Maduin would later be referred to by name as an Eidolon used by Eiko Carol in Final Fantasy IX and as a summon in Final Fantasy Tactics Advance, romanized instead as "Madeen". He also appears as an Esper in Final Fantasy Tactics A2 and as a transfiguration of Titan in World of Final Fantasy.

The Warring Triad 
After the seemingly endless period of near-apocalyptic destruction their conflict causes, the Triad willfully cease their battle and mutually seal away their abilities, reducing themselves to stone statues. It is the magical balance of these three that maintains harmony throughout the world, though Emperor Gestahl, obsessed with power, seeks the Triad to further his own desires. Gestahl is betrayed and slain by Kefka, who gains control of the Triad and upsets their balance – this singular act virtually annihilates the planet's surface, reducing it to a wasted, chaotic shadow. Drained of their power by Kefka in the time following his ascension, they are awakened as mindless husks that attack the party as the player traverses the mangled spires of Kefka's tower.

The Warring Triad appears in Final Fantasy XIV: Heavensward in the form of statues on the floating continent Azys Lla, virtually identical to the original sprites in appearance. A series of side quests allows players to fight them for powerful weapon rewards. In this appearance, they are elder primals awakened by the expansion's antagonist Thordan VII, who sought their power after becoming a primal himself. They are given names based on notes from original concept artwork that ended up not being used in Final Fantasy VI. The Fiend is named Sephirot, the Goddess Sophia and the Demon Zurvan.

Reception and legacy 
In its review of the Game Boy Advance release, IGN says Final Fantasy VIs "cast of characters is huge and varied, and though several of them do draw from traditional RPG archetypes, this was the game that helped define those archetypes in the first place". In the GameSpy review of the Game Boy Advance version, it is said that "the large cast of characters, that is one of this game's hallmarks, is most impressive because of their individuality, both from a story and from a gameplay perspective, as well as the amount of effort that was put into exploring their personalities, motivations, and histories". Nintendo Power described the characters as some of the more memorable Final Fantasy protagonists ever, citing the ending's great character moments.

Several characters from the game have received standalone praise, such as Kefka who has been repeatedly named one of the franchise's greatest villains. In 2008, IGN placed him sixth on their list of the "Top 25 Final Fantasy Characters" with similar sentiments, but also included several other characters from Final Fantasy VI on the list. Ultros, who placed twenty-fourth, was praised for bringing "much needed" comic relief for the title, described as being augmented by Ted Woolsey's translation for the North American localization. Celes placed fourteenth, and was stated as providing one of the greatest memorable scenes and musical pieces in the game through the impromptu opera scene. Setzer placed twelfth, described as having "that most crucial of qualities in a hero, an unshakable sense of humor", as well as introducing the Gambler job class that would appear in later titles in the series. Nintendo Power listed Shadow as one of the best ninjas on Nintendo consoles. In an article on Dissidia Final Fantasy, IGN editor Ryan Clements called Terra one of the most recognizable and well-loved characters to join the army of Cosmos. In another poll the same year, eight of the characters – Locke, Edgar, Celes, Setzer, Terra, Shadow, Sabin, and Relm – were named among the fifteen most popular characters in the Final Fantasy series. In 2012, IGN made a list of their all-time favorite Final Fantasy characters, and included Celes, Edgar, Kefka, Locke, and Ultros.

References 

Final Fantasy VI
Final Fantasy 06